Aaron Dickinson Woodruff (September 12, 1762 – June 24, 1817) was the Attorney General of New Jersey from 1792 to 1811 and from 1812 to 1817.

Biography
Woodruff was born in 1762 in Elizabeth, New Jersey, the oldest child of Elias and Mary Joline Woodruff. In 1779 he graduated from Princeton College as the valedictorian for his class. After serving in the American Revolutionary War, he was admitted to the bar in 1784. He served in the Electoral College and won a seat in the New Jersey General Assembly from Hunterdon County. As a legislator he was influential in having Trenton selected as the state capital in 1790.

In 1793, he was appointed New Jersey Attorney General and served in the position until 1811, when he was replaced by Andrew S. Hunter. Woodruff, who was a Federalist, was ousted by the Democratic-Republicans who had taken control of the New Jersey Legislature in that year's elections. However, when the Federalists regained control of the Legislature in 1812, they reinstated Woodruff as Attorney General.

Woodruff continued to serve until his death in 1817. He died at the home of his brother-in-law in Changewater (now Warren County, New Jersey).

References

1762 births
1817 deaths
Politicians from Elizabeth, New Jersey
Politicians from Hunterdon County, New Jersey
Princeton University alumni
Members of the New Jersey General Assembly
New Jersey Attorneys General